The Pac-12 Conference Coach of the Year is a baseball award given to the Pac-12 Conference's most outstanding coach. From 1978-1998, an award was given to the most outstanding Coach in both the North and South divisions. After the 1999 season, the divisions were eliminated.

Key

Winners

1999-Present

North Division (1978-1998)

South Division (1978-1998)

Winners by school

Footnotes
 For purposes of this table, the "year joined" reflects the year that each team joined the conference now known as the Pac-12 as currently chartered. Although the Pac-12 claims the Pacific Coast Conference (PCC), founded in 1915, as part of its own history, that conference disbanded in 1959 due to infighting and scandal. That same year, five PCC members established the Athletic Association of Western Universities (AAWU) under a new charter that functions to this day. The Coach of the Year Award was not established until 1978, by which time all of the final members of the PCC except for Idaho were reunited in what was then the Pac-8.
 Portland State was an affiliate member of the Pac-10 from 1982-1998.
 Gonzaga was an affiliate member of the Pac-10 from 1982-1995.

References

Awards established in 1978
Coach
NCAA Division I baseball conference coaches of the year
1978 establishments in the United States